Hear 'Em Rave is a 1918 American short comedy film featuring Harold Lloyd. The runtime of the short film is 11 minutes, and it was released on December 1, 1918 in the United States.

Cast
 Harold Lloyd 
 Snub Pollard 
 Bebe Daniels 
 William Blaisdell
 William Gillespie
 Lew Harvey
 Bud Jamison
 Oscar Larson
 James Parrott
 Dorothea Wolbert
 Noah Young

See also
 Harold Lloyd filmography

References

External links

1918 films
1918 short films
1918 comedy films
Silent American comedy films
American silent short films
American black-and-white films
Films directed by Gilbert Pratt
American comedy short films
1910s American films